Karl Gratz (24 January 1919 – 14 March 2002) was an Austrian-born Luftwaffe fighter pilot during World War II. As a fighter ace, he was credited with 138 aerial victories claimed in more than 900 missions. Gratz claimed the majority of his victories over the Eastern Front, and 17 over the Western Front.

In late 1941, Gratz was posted to Jagdgeschwader 52 (JG 52—8th squadron of the 52nd Fighter Wing) which at the time was fighting on the Eastern Front. He claimed his first aerial victory on 15 February 1942. On 1 July 1942, he was awarded the Knight's Cross of the Iron Cross following his 54th aerial victory. He then served as a fighter pilot instructor and was posted to Jagdgeschwader 2 "Richthofen" (JG 2—2nd Fighter Wing) in March 1943. Back on the Easter Front in 1944, he claimed his 100th aerial victory in March/April 1944. At the end of World War II, he served as Staffelkapitän (squadron leader) of 10. Staffel (10th squadron) of JG 52. He surrendered to United States Army forces and was turned over to the Red Army.

Gratz was released from captivity in 1949, joined the Bundeswehr and served in Jagdbombergeschwader 33 (JaBoG 33—Fighter-Bomber Wing 33). He retired in 1970 holding the rank of Oberstleutnant (lieutenant colonel). Gratz died on 14 March 2002 in Leck.

World War II
"Charlie" Gratz was posted in autumn 1941 to 8. Staffel (8th squadron) of Jagdgeschwader 52 (JG 52—8th squadron of the 52nd Fighter Wing), a squadron of III. Gruppe (3rd group), on the Eastern Front. In January 1942, III. Gruppe was ordered to move from Taganrog to an airfield at Kharkov and was subordinated to IV. Fliegerkorps. At the time, the Gruppe was the only fighter unit operating on the left flank of Army Group South, covering the airspace from Belgorod in the north to the Donets Basin in the south, and was equipped with Messerschmitt Bf 109 F-4. On 18 January, Soviet forces launched the Barvenkovo–Lozovaya Offensive which created the Izium salient. On 15 February, III. Gruppe flew missions in the vicinity of Belgorod and Prokhorovka, over the front lines of the 6th Army. That day, Gratz claimed his first two aerial victories, a Mikoyan-Gurevich MiG-3 fighter which at the time was referred to as an I-61, and an Ilyushin Il-2 ground-attack aircraft.

On 12 May, German forces launched Operation Fredericus, also referred to as the Second Battle of Kharkov, with the objective to eliminate the Izium bridgehead over Seversky Donets. That day, III. Gruppe was moved to the Kharkov-Rogan airfield, southeast of Kharkov, and subordinated to the Stab (headquarters unit) of JG 52. On 13 May, III. Gruppe flew combat missions east and southeast of Kharkov. During the day, the Gruppe claimed 42 aerial victories, including three Mikoyan-Gurevich MiG-1 fighters by Gratz. The following day, III. Gruppe predominantly flew fighter escort missions for Junkers Ju 87 dive bombers from VIII. Fliegerkorps attacking Soviet ground forces on the northern pincer, and claimed 52 aerial victories for the loss of one aircraft damaged. That day, Graz became an "ace-in-a-day" for the first time when he shot down two Lavochkin-Gorbunov-Gudkov LaGG-3 and seven MiG-1 fighters, taking his total to 27 aerial victories. During the following days, III. Gruppe continued to fly missions in support of the Army. Gratz claimed two Polikarpov I-16 fighters on 15 May, a single MiG-1 on 16 May, two further MiG-1s on 17 May, and yet another MiG-1 fighter on 18 May.

On 20 May, III. By the end of May 24, Soviet forces opposite Kharkov had been surrounded by German formations, over the next days, Soviet forces attempt to break the encirclement. During this combat, Gratz claimed four aerial victories on 26 May over two LaGG-3s and two MiG-1s. The next day, he added three further aerial victories to his tally over a LaGG-3 and two MiG-1s. On 29 May, his total reached 42 aerial victories when shot down an I-16 and yet another MiG-1. He received the Honor Goblet of the Luftwaffe on 8 June 1942.

He received the Knight's Cross of the Iron Cross on 1 July 1942. The presentation was made by Major Hubertus von Bonin. Gratz was one of four JG 52 pilots presented with the Knight's Cross that day. The other three pilots to receive the distinction that day were Feldwebel Alfred Grislawski, Feldwebel Karl Steffen and Oberleutnant Siegfried Simsch. By late 1942 29 more victories had been claimed.

On the Western Front
After a spell instructing, Gratz was posted in March 1943 to 11. Staffel (11th squadron) of Jagdgeschwader 2 "Richthofen" (JG 2—2nd Fighter Wing) on the English channel front. The 11. Staffel was an additional 4th squadron of I. Gruppe of JG 2 which was based at Triquerville and equipped with the Bf 109 G-3. On 1 October 1943, the squadron was renumbered and from then on was known as 4. Staffel of JG 2. 

The Royal Air Force (RAF) Fighter Command suffered only one casualty in combat that day. A Spitfire IX, BS548, flown by Captain O Massart of No. 340 Squadron was severely damaged in battle with a Fw 190 belonging to JG 2. The pilot returned unhurt. Massart formed part of a Ramrod patrol to Rouen.

Fighter Command lost ten pilots killed, one captured while two evaded capture with help from the French resistance. JG 26 claimed five, JG 2 claimed six and one fell in combat with JG 1. No. 129 Squadron RAF is known to have engaged JG 2 over the English Channel while on a Roadstead operation. JG 2 claimed two of their number. The only casualty was Flight Sergeant A J Symonds. His body was recovered by a Supermarine Walrus. The following day Gratz claimed a victory near Ostend. Fighter Command carried out two Ramrod operations in the morning and one in the afternoon, losing three fighters in total. No. 129 Squadron's Sergeant J S Hetherington, in Spitfire AR527, was killed in action with JG 2 on a sweep from Venturas to Landunvez. No. 332 Squadron RAF lost Spitfire ES291 and the pilot Sergeant S N Larssen killed on Ramrod 52 to Haamstede. In the afternoon, another Ramrod to Landunvez killed No. 616 Squadron RAF Flight Lieutenant P B Wright DFC in Spitfire BS465.

Gratz received the German Cross in Gold on 8 June 1943. On 16 August, the Eighth Air Force of the United States Army Air Forces (USAAF) targeted the Le Bourget airfield near Paris with a large formation of Boeing B-17 Flying Fortress escorted by a number of Republic P-47 Thunderbolt escort fighters. In defense of this attack, I. Gruppe of JG 2 claimed three B-17s and one P-47 shot down for the loss of five pilots killed in action.

On the Eastern Front
In March 1944, Gratz returned to JG 52. That month, Gratz was credited with his 100th aerial victory. He was the 64th Luftwaffe pilot to achieve the century mark. On 1 April 1945, Gratz was appointed Staffelkapitän (squadron leader) of 10. Staffel of JG 52. He succeeded Leutnant Viktor Petermann who was transferred. 10. Staffel was subordinated to III. Gruppe of JG 52 and headed by Major Adolf Borchers. In the last weeks of the war, Gratz was  particularly successful and claimed 18 victories. After the surrender he was delivered by U.S. military to the Soviet authorities and remained in captivity until 1949.

Later life
Post-war, his military service in the Bundeswehr saw him promoted to Oberstleutnant. Gratz served in Jagdbombergeschwader 33 (JaBoG 33—Fighter-Bomber Wing 33) flying the Republic F-84F Thunderstreak then under the command of Walter Krupinski. JaBoG 33 was transferred to the Turkish base at Bandırma for shooting and bombing training with live ammunition from 25 May to 31 August 1959. During one of the practice flights Gratz was nearly shot down by his wingman Leutnant Dietrich Schultz-Sembten. Schultz-Sembten had mistakenly fired all of his rockets prematurely during the attack run. After the landing, Gratz is quoted with having said: "Schultz-Sembten, you must have gone mad! I have to say one thing, you idiot: If you had hit me, I would have outmaneuvered you and shot you down."

Summary of career

Aerial victory claims
According to US historian David T. Zabecki, Gratz was credited with 138 aerial victories. Obermaier and Spick also list Gratz with 138 aerial victories, including 17 on the Western Front of which three of them were USAAF four-engined bombers. Barbas states that Gratz claimed 18 aerial victories after 16 February, 14 of which are undocumented. Mathews and Foreman, authors of Luftwaffe Aces — Biographies and Victory Claims, researched the German Federal Archives and state that Gratz was credited with 138 aerial victories. This figure includes 132 aerial victories on the Eastern Front and six over the Western Allies, including one four-engined bomber.

Victory claims were logged to a map-reference (PQ = Planquadrat), for example "PQ 44442". These sectors were then subdivided into 36 smaller units to give a location area 3 × 4 km in size.

Awards
 Iron Cross (1939) 2nd and 1st Class
 Honour Goblet of the Luftwaffe on 8 June 1942 as Unteroffizier and pilot
 German Cross in Gold on 8 June 1943 as Feldwebel in the 8./Jagdgeschwader 52
 Knight's Cross of the Iron Cross on 1 July 1942 as Unteroffizier and pilot in the 8./Jagdgeschwader 52

Notes

References

Citations

Bibliography

External links

Luftwaffe pilots
German World War II flying aces
Austrian military personnel of World War II
German Air Force pilots
Recipients of the Gold German Cross
Recipients of the Knight's Cross of the Iron Cross
German people of Austrian descent
People from Wiener Neustadt
1919 births
2002 deaths
World War II prisoners of war held by the Soviet Union